Benjamin Horace (Ben) Weese (born 1929) in Evanston, Illinois is an American architect hailing from Chicago, and a member of the architects group, the Chicago Seven. Weese is the younger brother of Chicago architect Harry Weese.

He received BArch and MArch degrees from Harvard University, and a certificate from the École des Beaux-Arts in Fontainebleau, France. He returned to Chicago in 1957 into his older brother's firm, Harry Weese Associates, which specialized in urban renewal and subsidized housing projects. In the late 1970s, he was a member of the Chicago Seven, a group which emerged in opposition to the doctrinal application of modernism, as represented particularly in Chicago by the followers of Ludwig Mies van der Rohe.

In 1977, Weese opened his own firm, Weese Seegers Hickey Weese, with his wife. This turned out to be an award-winning firm, later becoming Weese Langley Weese, and was best known for non-profit and educational projects with an emphasis on historical appreciation and preservation.

See also
Chicago Seven (architects)

References 
 "Biography of Ben Weese" - Art Institute of Chicago

External links 
 Oral history interview with Ben Weese -Oral history of Benjamin Horace Weese / interviewed by Annemarie van Roessel, compiled under the auspices of the Chicago Architects Oral History Project, the Ernest R. Graham Study Center for Architectural Drawings, Department of Architecture, the Art Institute of Chicago.

1929 births
Living people
Artists from Evanston, Illinois
Architects from Chicago
Harvard Graduate School of Design alumni